Francis Woods (28 January 1889 – 5 January 1951) was a New Zealand cricketer who played first-class cricket for Canterbury between 1913 and 1927.

Frank Woods was a middle-order batsman who occasionally kept wicket. His best performance was against Auckland in 1925-26, when he scored 124 not out (the only century in the match) and 76. He was selected to keep wicket for South Island against North Island in 1921-22.

References

External links

Frank Woods at CricketArchive

1889 births
1951 deaths
New Zealand cricketers
Canterbury cricketers
Cricketers from Christchurch
South Island cricketers